Stella Huang, born 17 December 1980, is a singer, actress and former businesswoman.

Singing and acting career

Apart from her duties as a recording artist, she also acts for a variety of television serials in Taiwan and Singapore. Some of her serials have included a lead role as Sam in MediaCorp's Beautiful Trio with award-winning veteran actresses Huang Biren and Ivy Lee, and a role in the China action film Kung Fu Girls, where she also performed the theme song of the soundtrack to the film. She starred as the lead character in the 2002 television series Marmalade Boy, for which she also sang the theme song, "溫室的花 Wēnshì de Huā (Greenhouse Flower)".

In 2017, she formed a children musical group, Bossa Baby, with five other musicians producing children songs in the bossa nova style.

Pastry businesses
In 2005, Huang decided to take a break from showbiz. She set up a specialty cake shop in Taipei under the Awfully Chocolate franchise, investing US$200,000 into the business with a partner.

In 2007, Awfully Chocolate terminated the franchise and sued Stella's company. A court order required Stella to pay approximately $224,000 but due to non-payment by her, the cake firm issued a letter of statutory demand to her in January 2009.

Stella set up her own bakery, Black As Chocolate (BAC), after the termination of her franchisee licence from Awfully Chocolate. The bakery has since been managed by her husband's family.

Personal life

Stella was educated at Crescent Girls' School, Anglo-Chinese Junior College, and the National University of Singapore. In August 2011, Stella married businessman Armstrong Yeh in Vancouver, Canada. She gave birth to a son named Ashton on 8 August 2012. In 2018, she migrated to Vancouver, Canada for Ashton's educational development.

Albums

Filmography

Awards

References

External links
 Official website of Stella's business, Black As Chocolate (BAC)
 Stella Huang on Facebook
 

1980 births
Living people
Anglo-Chinese Junior College alumni
Singaporean people of Hokkien descent
National University of Singapore alumni
21st-century Singaporean women singers
Singaporean Mandopop singers